The Autozam Scrum, later known as Mazda Scrum, is a cabover microvan and kei truck sold exclusively in Japan by  Japanese automaker Mazda. Originally part of the company's Autozam marque, it was first introduced in June 1989 (DG41, DH41 for 4WD versions). Mazda still sells the Scrum under its own name. The Scrum is a rebadged version of the Suzuki Carry/Every and used Suzuki engines.

A passenger car version called the Scrum Wagon was added for 2000, while the commercial truck and van were updated.

The Mazda Scrum uses a 660-cc, DOHC, three-cylinder engine, and is available with either four-wheel drive(4WD) or two-wheel drive (2WD). The 4WD version can also be switched between 4WD and 2WD and has high- and low-gear ranges.

The name "scrum" comes from a maneuver from the game of rugby, signifying toughness.

References

External links
 MAZDA SCRUM WAGON｜Mazda
 MAZDA SCRUM VAN｜Mazda
 MAZDA SCRUM TRUCK｜Mazda

Scrum
Scrum
OEM Suzuki vehicles
Microvans
Cab over vehicles
1990s cars
2000s cars
Kei trucks
Pickup trucks